A list of windmills in the Dutch province of Zeeland.

 
Zeeland